Maren Lutz (born 31 March 1999) is a German female canoeist who won five medals at senior level at the Wildwater Canoeing World Championships.

Medals at the World Championships
Senior

References

External links
 

1999 births
Living people
German female canoeists
Place of birth missing (living people)